The Western India cricket team was active in first-class cricket from November 1933 until February 1946, operating in the West Zone of the Ranji Trophy for twelve seasons. It was based in Rajkot, Gujarat, then part of Saurashtra State.

Western India, captained by the Englishman Herbert Barritt, won the Ranji Trophy in 1943-44.

Honours
 Ranji Trophy
 Winners (1): 1943-44

Notes

Indian first-class cricket teams
1933 establishments in India
1946 disestablishments in India
Cricket clubs established in 1933